Just Henrik Ely (30  November 1759 – 30  March 1824) was a Norwegian military officer who served as a representative at the Norwegian Constitutional Assembly during 1814.

Just Henrik Ely born at Stavanger in Rogaland, Norway.  His father was a military officer, and later customs inspector in Tønsberg. In 1776, Just Henrik Ely became Sergeant. In 1782 he became Second Lieutenant.. He was promoted to First Lieutenant in 1786. In 1800. he became Captain of the regiment. In 1811 he was promoted to Major.

He represented Vesterlenske infanteriregiment, together with Omund Bjørnsen Birkeland, at the Norwegian Constituent Assembly at Eidsvoll in 1814.

References

External links
 Representantene på Eidsvoll 1814 (Cappelen Damm AS)
 Men of Eidsvoll (eidsvollsmenn)

Related Reading
 Holme Jørn (2014) De kom fra alle kanter - Eidsvollsmennene og deres hus  (Oslo: Cappelen Damm) 

1759 births
1824 deaths
People from Stavanger
Norwegian Army personnel
Norwegian military personnel of the Napoleonic Wars
Fathers of the Constitution of Norway